Joseph A. Gregori High School is a high school in Modesto, California, United States. When it opened in fall 2010, it was the seventh comprehensive high school in Modesto City Schools.

History
Planning for this school started in the early 1990s, following a lengthy history within the district of the need for another campus to accommodate students in the Salida area and northwest Modesto, relieving overcrowding at Modesto and Davis High School. In 2001, Modesto City Schools passed a high school bond called Measure T that provided $65 million for the construction of two high schools.

The school is named for Joseph Gregori, who served as a principal, teacher, and coach in the Modesto City Schools for 28 years before his death in 1998 at age 50.

The school opened in the fall of 2010 with 9th and 10th grade students. It was designed for a capacity of 2,500 students and was projected to open with 1,800–1,950 students.

Campus

The  campus sits on land formerly used as almond and walnut orchards. Modesto City School District purchased the  property from the family of Dick and Jennie Van Konynenburg.  The family had owned the property since 1932.

Some adjacent property owners criticized the Modesto City School District for their use of eminent domain to purchase easements, rights of way, and land in order to widen Stoddard Road.

The school's 14  buildings were designed by Fresno-based firm Darden Architects as a mirror image of nearby James C. Enochs High School.

Curriculum
Gregori has a huge campus and has over 2,000 students enrolled, so the student body is split up in 4 different SLCs (Small Learning Communities).
 Digital Media & Business
 Visual & Performing Arts
 Global Studies
 Career Technology

Although it is a newer school, Gregori has a lot of electives to offer including classes in the categories of: foreign languages, visual and performing arts, agriculture, business, health, physical education, broadcast & multimedia journalism, and digital media.

Extracurricular activities

Gregori features normal extracurricular activities in all major sports. 
 Football
 Basketball
 Cross country
 Softball
 Baseball
 Track and field
 Tennis
 Volleyball
 Wrestling
 Water polo
 Swimming
 Golf
 Soccer

In addition to after-school sports, Gregori offers a variety of clubs on campus. Here is a list of current clubs and organizations:

 Academic Decathlon
 Art
 Black Student Union
 Broadcast Journalism
 Chess
 Cube Club
 Drama
 Fashion Club
 FBLA
 FFA
 French Club
 Get Motivated Daily
 Global Club
 Gregori Card Club
 Gregori Christian Outreach
 Hip Hop Club
 H.Y.L.C (Hispanic Youth Leadership Counsel)
 Interact Club
 K.E.Y. Club
 Leadership
 LGBT
 Military Club
 PHAST
 Philosophy Club
 Photography
 Ping Pong
 Speech
 Teens Run Modesto
 Triathlon
 Tri-M Honor Music Society
 Ultimate Frisbee Club
 World Media

References

External links
 https://web.archive.org/web/20100528144228/http://schools.monet.k12.ca.us/Public/Schools/GHS/default.aspx

Educational institutions established in 2010
High schools in Stanislaus County, California
Education in Modesto, California
Public high schools in California
2010 establishments in California